Gottfried von Strassburg (died c. 1210) is the author of the Middle High German courtly romance , an adaptation of the 12th-century Tristan and Iseult legend. Gottfried's work is regarded, alongside the Nibelungenlied and Wolfram von Eschenbach's Parzival, as one of the great narrative masterpieces of the German Middle Ages. He is probably also the composer of a small number of surviving lyrics. His work became a source of inspiration for Richard Wagner's opera Tristan und Isolde (1865).

Life
Other than an origin in or close association with Strasbourg, nothing is known of his life. It would seem, however, that he was a man of good birth and position, who filled an important municipal office in his native city of Strasbourg, but since he is always referred to in German as Meister (master) and not Herr (sir), it seems safe to assume he was not a knight, a conclusion supported by the rather dismissive attitude toward knightly exploits shown in Tristan.

Tristan ends abruptly, and according to the testimony of Ulrich von Türheim and Heinrich von Freiberg, two people who provided endings for Tristan,  Gottfried died before finishing the work. References in the work suggest it was written during the first decade of the 13th century, and 1210 is taken, conventionally, as the date of Gottfried's death.

His thorough familiarity with Latin literature and rhetorical theory suggest someone who had enjoyed a high level of monastic education. He also shows detailed technical knowledge of music and hunting, far beyond anything found in the works of his contemporaries. Gottfried draws more on the learned tradition of medieval humanism than on the chivalric ethos shared by his major literary contemporaries.  He also appears to have been influenced by the writings of contemporary Christian mystics, in particular Bernard of Clairvaux. 

That his home was in Strasbourg is supported by the fact that the earliest manuscripts of Tristan, dating from the first half of the 13th century, show features of Alemannic and specifically Alsatian dialect.

Style
Gottfried's rhetorical style is very distinct among his contemporaries.  
It is incredibly complex, marked by the extensive use of symmetrical structure in his organization of Tristan as a whole, as well as in the structure of individual passages.  Gottfried also uses detailed word and sound patterns, playing with such things as rhyme, alliteration, and assonance.  See Batts (1971) for a detailed analysis.

One of the greatest hallmarks of Gottfried's style is his skillful use of irony, to both humorous and tragic effects.  He may also have relied on irony to disguise his criticisms of contemporary society in order to avoid censure.

Sources
Gottfried states that the Tristan of Thomas of Britain, an Anglo-French work of around 1160, was the source of his work. He explains that he bases himself on Thomas because he "told the tale correctly", distancing himself from the less courtly versions of the story represented by Béroul in Old French and Eilhart von Oberge in Middle High German.

Unfortunately, Thomas's work, too, is fragmentary and there is little overlap with Gottfried's poem, making it difficult to evaluate Gottfried's originality directly. However, Thomas's Tristan was the source of a number of other versions, which makes it possible to get some idea of style and content. It is clear that while Gottfried's statement of his reliance on and debt to Thomas is correct, he both expanded on his source and refined the story psychologically. The discovery in 1995 of the Carlisle Fragment of Thomas's Tristan, which includes material from one of the central parts of the story, the Love Grotto episode, promises a better understanding of Gottfried's use of his source.

Thomas's source, in turn, is a now lost Old French Tristan story, reconstructed by Joseph Bédier, which derives ultimately from Celtic legend.

Text
The text of Tristan is 19,548 lines long, and is written, like all courtly romances, in rhyming couplets.

The first section (ll. 1-44) of the prologue is written in quatrains and is referred to as the "strophic prologue", while pairs of quatrains, of sententious content, mark the main divisions of the story. The initial letters of the quatrains, indicated by large initials in some manuscripts, form an acrostic with the names Gotefrid-Tristan-Isolde, which runs throughout the poem. In addition, the initial letters of the quatrains in the prologue give the name Dieterich, which is assumed to have been the name of Gottfried's patron.

If Gottfried had completed Tristan it would probably have been around 24,000 lines long.

Story
The story starts with the courtship of Tristan's parents. Riwalin, King of Parmenie, travels to the court of King Marke in Cornwall, where he and Marke's sister, Blanschefleur, fall in love. Blanschfleur becomes pregnant and the couple steal back to Parmenie, but Riwalin is killed in battle. When she hears the news, Blanschfleur dies, but the baby is delivered and survives. He is named Tristan because of the sorrowful circumstances of his birth.

Tristan grows up in Parmenie, passed off as the son of Riwalin's marshal Rual li Fointeant, becoming the perfect courtier. While on board a merchant ship which has docked in Parmenie, Tristan is abducted by the Norwegian crew. Once at sea, the ship is struck by a tempest, the crew conclude that they are being punished by God for abducting Tristan, so they set him ashore in a country that turns out to be Cornwall.

Tristan encounters a hunting party, whom he astonishes with his skill, and he accompanies them to Marke's court, where his many accomplishments make him popular, particularly with Marke. Eventually, after years of searching, Rual comes to Cornwall and finds Tristan, who is now revealed as Marke's nephew. Tristan is knighted.

Cornwall is being forced to pay tribute to the King of Ireland, Gurmun, collected by his brother, the monstrous Morold. Tristan challenges Morold to a duel and defeats him, though he becomes wounded by Morold's poisoned sword. In order to seek a cure Tristan travels to Ireland incognito (under the name Tantris), and contrives to get himself cured by Gurmun's Queen Isolde (Isolde the Wise). He is struck by the beauty and accomplishments of her daughter, Isolde the Fair, and returns to Cornwall singing her praises.

Jealous of Tristan, Marke's councillors press him to marry, so that Tristan can be ousted as heir. Hoping that he will be killed in the process, they suggest Tristan be sent to Ireland to woo Isolde for Marke. Tristan travels to Ireland (as Tantris) and kills a dragon which has been threatening the countryside, thus winning Isolde's hand. However, observing that the splinter previously found in Morold's skull matches Tantris's sword, Isolde realises Tantris is in fact Tristan, and threatens to kill him as he sits in the bath. Her mother and her kinswoman Brangaene intervene and Tristan explains the purpose of his journey, which leads to a reconciliation between Ireland and Cornwall. Tristan leaves for Cornwall with Isolde as a bride for Marke.

Isolde the Wise has given Brangaene a magic potion to be drunk by Marke and Isolde on their wedding night to ensure their love. On the voyage, however, it is drunk by Tristan and Isolde by mistake. They avow their love for each other, but know that it cannot be made public, and they enjoy a brief idyll on board before arriving in Cornwall. This is followed by a series of intrigues in which the lovers attempt to dupe Marke, starting with the wedding night, when the virgin Brangaene substitutes for Isolde in the marriage bed. Marke is suspicious but is constantly outwitted by the lovers' guile.

Eventually, Marke resigns himself to their love and banishes them from court. They go off into the wilderness, to a Love Grotto, where they enjoy an idyllic life away from society. By accident, Marke discovers the grotto and sees them lying side by side. However, aware of his approach, Tristan has placed his sword between himself and Isolde, duping Marke into believing that perhaps they are not lovers after all.

With their secret hideaway discovered, the lovers return to court. However, Marke's suspicions return and finally he finds them together and can no longer doubt their adultery. Tristan flees to Normandy, where he encounters Isolde of the White Hands, daughter of the Duke of Arundel. Gottfried's poem ends with Tristan expressing his emotional confusion over the two Isoldes.

In Thomas's poem, which is preserved from around this point, Tristan marries Isolde of the White Hands, though the marriage is never consummated. Tristan creates a hall of statues, with statues of Isolde and Brangaene. Tristan is wounded with a poisoned spear by Estult li Orgillus, and sends for Isolde the Fair, who is the only one who can cure him. It is agreed that the ship sent for her will bear a white sail if it returns with her on board, but a black sail if not. However, the jealous Isolde of the White Hands lies about the colour of the sail, and Isolde the Fair arrives to find Tristan dead of grief. She kisses him and dies.

Interpretation
Gottfried's Tristan has proved problematic to interpret, probably in part because it was arguably left unfinished.  Much of critics' difficulty in interpreting the work was entirely intentional on the part of Gottfried; his extensive use of irony in the text is clearly the greatest cause of disagreement over the meaning of his poem.

"Tristan" contrasts significantly with the works of Gottfried's contemporaries in three ways:
 The hero of Tristan is a primarily an artist and trickster rather than a knight, that is, he lives on his wits rather than his martial prowess. While Tristan has all the accomplishments of a knight, questions of chivalric ethos are irrelevant to the story and the role of the fighting man in society, central to the works of Hartmann von Aue and Wolfram von Eschenbach, is never at issue.
 Contemporary heroes fall in love with a lady because of her beauty and her moral worth. Tristan and Isolde, in spite of their physical beauty and many accomplishments, which cause them to be generally adored, fall in love not for any such explicable reason, but because the love potion leaves them no choice.
 Where contemporaries look for balance in life and subordination of the will of the individual (whether to God, or society, or both), Gottfried appears to exalt love as the supreme value, regardless of social consequences and heedless of the sinful nature of Tristan and Isolde's adultery.

This "exaltation of love" has led some critics to see Tristan as effectively heretical, with Tristan and Isolde as "saints" of a religion of love, though how such a work could have been repeatedly read and copied at 13th century courts remains puzzling. Does the use of religious language imagery for the lovers mean that they represent an alternative religion, or is this simply a technique to communicate their exemplary role and the sublime nature of their love?

Alternatively, some critics see the work not as a pure exaltation of love, but rather as an exploration of the conflict between passionate love and courtly social order.  That Tristan is not knightly represents a rejection of the norms of feudal society; he allows himself to be guided by love and physical passion rather than chivalry.  The deaths of Tristan and Isolde would then seem inevitable, in that their love could not overcome the contemporary social order.

The role of the potion remains contentious - is it:
 simply a narrative device, of no import in itself, but required to deflect moral criticism?
 a symbol of their falling in love?
 the cause of their love, indicating love's irrational and irresistible nature?

The story itself also raises problems. If the power of the love potion is irresistible, how can Tristan's marriage to Isolde of the White Hands be explained? If love is the supreme value, why do Tristan and Isolde leave their idyllic life in the Love Grotto, to return to a life of occasional secret trysts? Some have even argued that Gottfried abandoned the work, unable to solve these contradictions.

Gottfried and his contemporaries
One of the most important passages in Tristan, one which owes nothing to Thomas, is the so-called literary excursus, in which Gottfried names and discusses the merits of a number of contemporary lyric and narrative poets. This is the first piece of literary criticism in German.

Gottfried praises the Minnesänger Reinmar von Hagenau and Walther von der Vogelweide, and the narrative poets Hartmann von Aue, Heinrich von Veldeke and Bligger von Steinach, the former for their musicality, the latter for their clarity, both features which mark Gottfried's own style. Conversely, he criticises, without naming him directly, Wolfram von Eschenbach for the obscurity of his style and the uncouthness of his vocabulary.

Reception

There are 29 known manuscripts of Gottfried's Tristan, dating from the 13th to the 15th century. Of these 11 are complete.

The unfinished Tristan was completed by two later poets, Ulrich von Türheim around 1235 and Heinrich von Freiberg around 1290, but their source for the latter part of the story is not Thomas's Tristan, and is generally thought to be the earlier and less courtly version of the story by Eilhart von Oberge, written around 1175. All but two of the complete manuscripts of Gottfried's work include a continuation by Ulrich or Heinrich; one uses the final part of Eilhart's work. Only one has no continuation at all.

Gottfried's work is praised by a number of later 13th-century writers, including Rudolf von Ems and Konrad von Würzburg, and was used, together with Eilhart von Oberge's version and Heinrich von Freiberg's continuation as a source for the Old Czech Tristan, written in the latter third of the 14th century.

While Gottfried's poem was still being copied in the 15th century, it was Eilhart von Oberge's less sophisticated narrative of the Tristan story that was the source of the first printed version, the 1484 Tristrant und Isalde, a work in prose which is not to be confused with the French Prose Tristan, also known as the Roman de Tristan en Prose.

Gottfried's work was rediscovered in the late 18th century, and is the source of Richard Wagner's opera Tristan und Isolde (1865).

Editions
The first modern edition of Gottfried's Tristan was that of Christian Heinrich Myller in 1785, and there have been many since. However, there is still no satisfactory critical edition and three editions are in use:
 Friedrich Ranke (Weidmann 1930, with corrections 1949). This is the standard edition, but contains no critical apparatus. The text of Ranke's edition (without line numbering) is available at Projekt Gutenberg-DE. All Tristan literature uses Ranke's line numbering for references to the text.
 K. Marold (de Gruyter 1906), republished in 2004 with an afterword by Werner Schröder . Though the text is inferior to Ranke's, this is the only edition to provide full critical apparatus.
 R. Bechstein (2 vols, Leipzig, 1870), re-issued in a revised version edited by Peter Ganz (2 vols, Brockhaus 1978), which includes Bechstein's running commentary and indicates differences from Ranke's text.

Translations
English translations:
Jessie Weston (London, 1899)
E.H. Zeydel (Princeton, 1948)
A.T. Hatto, with the Tristran of Thomas (London: Penguin, 1960). 
William T. Whobrey, Tristan and Isolde, with Ulrich von Türheim's Continuation (Indianapolis: Hackett, 2020). 
Modern German translations:
Xenja von Ertzdorff, Doris Scholz, Carola Voelkel (Fink, 1979) 
Wolfgang Mohr (Kümmerle, 1979), in verse, based on Hermann Kurtz's translation 
Rüdiger Krohn (Reclam 1980)  and 
Dieter Kühn (Reclam, 1998) 
Peter Knecht (de Gruyter, 2004) 

There are many older translations. However, any made before 1930, when Ranke's edition was first published, will be based on an outdated edition of the text.

Notes

References

External links

 
An excerpt from Gottfried's prologue to Tristan, as translated by Matthew Wildermuth

12th-century births
13th-century German poets
1210 deaths
Alsatian-German people
Writers of Arthurian literature
Minnesingers
Writers from Strasbourg
Epic poets
German male poets
12th-century German poets
Tristan and Iseult